"Don't Let Me Down" is a single by Liverpool-based pop group the Farm released as the third and final single from their album Spartacus. It was released on 22 April 1991 (eight days before the album itself), having been produced by Graham "Suggs" McPherson of Madness. The single reached #36 on the UK Singles Chart.

The foot featured on the cover of the single is that of John Goldsmid, a model, socialite, and fashion designer, who was renting a studio next to the Farm's when the record was released.

External links

1990 songs
1991 singles
The Farm (British band) songs
Songs written by Peter Hooton
Songs written by Steve Grimes